Erling Christophersen (April 17, 1898 – November 9, 1994) was a Norwegian botanist, geographer and diplomat.  He participated in and led several notable scientific expeditions in the 20th century, including the fifth Tanager Expedition (1924) to Nihoa and Necker Island and the Norwegian Scientific Expedition to Tristan da Cunha (1937–1938).

Early life
Christophersen was born in Christiania, Norway (now known as Oslo) in 1898.  He attended the University of Christiania from 1918–1921, and received his Ph.D from Yale University in 1924.  Christophersen's dissertation, "Soil reaction and plant distribution in the Sylene National Park, Norway", focused on the art and science of applied forest ecology, or silviculture, of alpine plants in Norway.

Career
Christophersen was a professor of botany at the University of Hawaii from 1929-1932.  He was instrumental in developing and leading the scientific expedition to Tristan da Cunha from 1937-1938.  His book,  Tristan da Cunha, the lonely island (1938), is an account of the expedition.

Selected publications

"Vascular plants of Johnston and Wake Islands" (1931)
"Plants of Gough Islands" (1934)
"Flowering plants of Samoa" (1935)
Tristan da Cunha, the Lonely Isle (1938)

See also 
Amaranthus brownii
Diospyros christophersenii

References

Further reading

External links

1898 births
1994 deaths
20th-century Norwegian botanists
Diplomats from Oslo
Yale University alumni
University of Hawaiʻi faculty
Scientists from Oslo